Lake Virelles is an artificial lake in Wallonia near the city of Chimay in Belgium. The lake is an important nature reserve with a great number of birds. The lake covers 1,25 km².

References
Aquascope of Virelles

Virelles
Virelles
Virelles
Chimay